Attica is a city in Logan Township, Fountain County, Indiana, United States.

History
Attica was laid out by George Hollingsworth and platted by David Stump in 1825.  The completion of the Wabash and Erie Canal through the town in 1847 brought a considerable amount of growth to the area, and ended (in Attica's favor) a long-standing rivalry with the neighboring communities of Rob Roy, Williamsport and Covington.

Attica is the nearest town to the location where Paul Dresser is believed to have written the state song, "On the Banks of the Wabash, Far Away", and the bridge over the Wabash River bears his name.

The Attica Downtown Historic District, Attica Main Street Historic District, Brady Street Historic District, Marshall M. Milford House, and Old East Historic District are listed on the National Register of Historic Places.

Geography

Attica is located at  (40.290227, -87.246973) along the Wabash River in Logan Township. U.S. Route 41, State Road 28, and State Road 55 intersect at Attica.

Demographics

As of the 2010 United States Census, there were 3,245 people, 1,308 households, and 843 families residing here. The racial makeup was 97.8% white, 0.3% Asian, 0.2% American Indian, 0.1% black or African American, 0.6% from other races, and 1.0% from two or more races. Those of Hispanic or Latino origin made up 2.4% of the population. In terms of ancestry, 26.3% were German, 14.1% were English, 13.9% were Irish, and 12.3% were American.

Of the 1,308 households, 32.0% had children under the age of 18 living with them, 47.2% were married couples living together, 12.4% had a female householder with no husband present, 35.6% were non-families, and 30.3% of all households were made up of individuals. The average household size was 2.45 and the average family size was 3.00. The median age was 38.9 years.

The median income for a household was $34,804 and the median income for a family was $52,669. Males had a median income of $45,682 versus $24,574 for females. The per capita income for was $21,287. About 13.3% of families and 16.3% of the population were below the poverty line, including 26.0% of those under age 18 and 13.9% of those age 65 or over.

Education
The city has a free lending library, the Attica Public Library.

Notable people
 Grand Ole Opry founder George Dewey Hay, honored posthumously as a Sagamore of the Wabash in 1988.

References

External links
 Attica Community Foundation

Cities in Indiana
Cities in Fountain County, Indiana